The 6th World Scout Jamboree was held in 1947 and was hosted by France at Moisson. This was the first jamboree to have been held after Baden-Powell's death in 1941. It was originally planned to take place in 1941 in France.

Unofficial theme
Following the devastation of World War II, this event was aptly named the Jamboree of Peace. The Jamboree showed that even through the years of the war, the Scout Movement was still strong and growing. 24,152 Scouts attended the event from 38 countries.

High-ranked visitors
The President of the French Republic, Vincent Auriol, paid an official visit on August 14, 1947, and saw a special arena program, including massed Highland dancing by the Scots. He toured around the camp, partially on foot and partially on the unique little railway, brought from the Maginot Line, that circled around among the subcamps. His visit was also marked by clouds of dust-Moisson was the "Dustboree"-and by hordes of press photographers who seemed to make a point to get in his way, at which point General Joseph Lafont made the sotto voce plea "God Save the King!"

See also
 World Scout Jamboree
 Raymond Schlemmer

External links
 Jamboree 1947 Website (French)
 Jamboree Histories at Scout.org

References

1947

1947 in France